The 1992 Temple Owls football team represented Temple University in the 1992 NCAA Division I-A football season. They were part of the Big East, placing last in the conference with a season record of one win, ten losses.

Schedule

References

Temple
Temple Owls football seasons
Temple Owls football